Delfina Rizal Herbosa de Natividad (December 20, 1879 – March 10, 1900) was a Filipino renowned for being one of the three women, together with Marcela Agoncillo and her daughter Lorenza, who seamed together the Philippine flag, and for being the niece of the National Hero of the Philippines, José Rizal.

Early life
Delfina Rizal Herbosa was born on December 20, 1879 in Calamba, Laguna to Mariano Herbosa and Lucia Rizal, sister of José Rizal, and she was of Spanish and Chinese descent. At the age of thirteen, she joined the Katipunan because her desire to fight oppression after her father was denied a Christian burial by the Spanish friars because of the claim that he did not go to confession, although the apparent reason is that they were related to José Rizal, whose novel Noli me Tangere exposed the abuses of the Spaniards.

Marriage and making of the Philippine flag
Delfina was married to Jose Salvador Alejandrino Natividad, whom she met in the Katipunan, and who later became a general of the Philippine Revolution. She then accompanied her husband to his self-exile to Hong Kong where there she was asked by Marcela Agoncillo to help her and her daughter sew together the Philippine flag.

Death
Natividad and her husband had a daughter together named Paz, who died at the age of two due to an alcohol lamp falling on her, this caused Natividad much sorrow and mental anguish, thus causing her death at the age of 20.

In popular culture
 Portrayed by Jenny Javier in the 2012 film, El Presidente.

References

1879 births
1900 deaths
People from Calamba, Laguna
Filipino people of Chinese descent
Filipino people of Spanish descent
People of the Philippine Revolution
José Rizal